The 1969–70 Yugoslav Cup was the 23rd season of the top football knockout competition in SFR Yugoslavia, the Yugoslav Cup, also known as the "Marshal Tito Cup" (Kup Maršala Tita), since its establishment in 1946.

First round

Garnizon Krajlevo 2–3 Partizan

Round of 16

Crvena zvezda – Željezničar Sarajevo 1–0

OFK Beograd – Rudar Kakanj 2–0

Olimpija – Buducnost Peć 3–0

Orijent Rijeka – Dinamo Zagreb 0–1

Osijek – Vojvodina 1–3

Proleter Zrenjanin – Partizan 0–0 a.e.t. (4–3 pen.)

Radnički Niš – Sutjeska Nikšić 1–0

Vardar – Hajduk Split 1–1 a.e.t. (3–4 pen.)

Quarter-finals

Dinamo Zagreb – Hajduk Split 1–0

OFK Beograd – Crvena zvezda 0–1

Radnički Niš – Proleter Zrenjanin 2–0

Vojvodina – Olimpija 0–2 a.e.t.

Semi finals

Crvena zvezda – Radnički Niš 2–0

Olimpija – Dinamo Zagreb 3–1

Finals
First leg

Second leg

See also
1969–70 Yugoslav First League

External links
1969–70 Yugoslav Cup details at Rec.Sport.Soccer Statistics Foundation

Yugoslav Cup seasons
Cup
Yugo